In mathematics, and specifically in group theory, a non-abelian group, sometimes called a non-commutative group, is a group (G, ∗) in which there exists at least one pair of elements a and b of G, such that a ∗ b ≠ b ∗ a. This class of groups contrasts with the abelian groups. (In an abelian group, all pairs of group elements commute). 

Non-abelian groups are pervasive in mathematics and physics. One of the simplest examples of a non-abelian group is the dihedral group of order 6. It is the smallest finite non-abelian group. A common example from physics is the rotation group SO(3) in three dimensions (for example, rotating something 90 degrees along one axis and then 90 degrees along a different axis is not the same as doing them in reverse order).

Both discrete groups and continuous groups may be non-abelian. Most of the interesting Lie groups are non-abelian, and these play an important role in gauge theory.

See also
 Associative algebra
 Noncommutative geometry
 Niels Henrik Abel

References

Properties of groups